Ferdinand Oscar Finne (12 October 1910 – 31 December 1999) was a Norwegian author, painter, graphic artist, theater decorator and costume designer.

Biography
He was the son of Esther Lucy Egeberg (1887–1962) and Severin Finne (1883–1953). His father was a lawyer and his mother was the daughter of Norwegian merchant Ferdinand Julian Egeberg. 
Finne was the brother of the architect Hans-Gabriel Finne (1916–2012). His parents divorced while he was still a child, and his mother moved with her children  to Great Britain.

He was costume designer at Nationaltheatret from 1935 to 1938. At the outbreak of World War II in 1940, Finne was in London  where he reported for duty at the Norwegian embassy. Finne started his career as an artist under the direction of  the  Austrian expressionistic painter Oskar Kokoschka  (1886–1980) in London. 
He subsequently studied at the National Art Academy in Oslo with Norwegian artists Per Krogh and Jean Heiberg. After a stay in Paris, with Fernand Léger, he had his artist debut in 1954. He wrote on art in various newspapers and magazines, and published a number of books. In 1990, Finne had a very successful solo exhibition at the Henie Onstad Kunstsenter.

He was decorated Knight, First Class of the Royal Norwegian Order of St. Olav in 1991.  From around 1960 he lived for 25 years on the Spanish island of Ibiza. Ferdinand Finne died at Oslo in 1999. He is represented in the National Gallery of Norway with several art works.

Selected writings
Store motekonger, 1939
Øya og huset, 1956
Den grønne lagune. En pastorale, 1967
Såvidt jeg husker, 1974
En krans av greske øyer, 1977
Veien blir til mens du går, 1985
Så vidt jeg husker – og litt til, 1986
Vandrer mot en annen strand. En reise mellom øyer, en bok om tro og kunst, 1990
Ringer i et hav. En krans av greske øyer, 1991
Sangen om Sørlandet. Historien om en øy og et hus, 1993
Blå elefant – ekko fra India, 1998

References

1910 births
1999 deaths
Artists from Oslo
20th-century Norwegian painters
Norwegian male painters
20th-century Norwegian writers
20th-century Norwegian male writers
20th-century Norwegian male artists